Faqir Hussain (born 15 May 1948) is a Pakistani retired footballer.

Club career
In 1961, while playing for Pakistan Airforce in a friendly game versus Iranian club Shahin F.C., he scored all 4 goals for his team in a match which ended in a 6-4 defeat.

National career
Faqir Hussain joined Pakistan Airforce in 1958 and visited India in 1959 after being selected in Pakistan Football team, played against Indian Bombay 11, and won the match with 2-1, also played with India National football team Won one match and another was a draw in South India also played two matches against Israel with one match resulting in a draw and the other was lost. He represented Pakistan National Football team for Ten years and was also Captain for four years. Played RCD Cup 1965, also played Pr-Olympic in 1964, During his professional career he played in China, Bangladesh, India, Sri Lanka, Iran, Turkey, Japan, Cyprus, Saudi Arabia, etc.

He also played Inter Services, and National Championship with in the country.

While playing in China, he was declared as the fastest player.

Faqir Hussain was a qualified/trained FIFA Coach,

References

Pakistani footballers
Pakistan international footballers
Living people
1948 births

Association football forwards